The Belmont International Open was a match-play golf tournament played at Belmont Country Club in Belmont, Massachusetts from September 22 to 28, 1937. Prize money was $12,000.

There was a 36-hole stroke-play stage played on September 22 and 23 after which the leading 64 players advanced to the match-play stage. Tony Manero led the stroke-play with a score of 140. 14 players on 153 had a playoff for 9 remaining places. Two 18-hole rounds were played on September 24 which reduced the field to 16. There were then four 36-hole rounds from September 25 to 28. Byron Nelson beat Henry Picard 5&4 in the final, taking the first prize of $3,000. The beaten semi-finalists were Harry Cooper and Ralph Guldahl.

Winners

References

1937 in golf
1937 in sports in Massachusetts
Belmont, Massachusetts
Former PGA Tour events
Golf in Massachusetts
History of Middlesex County, Massachusetts
September 1937 sports events
Sports competitions in Massachusetts
Sports in Middlesex County, Massachusetts
Tourist attractions in Middlesex County, Massachusetts